Joseph Rudolph "Philly Joe" Jones (July 15, 1923 – August 30, 1985) was an American jazz drummer.

Biography

Early career
As a child, Jones appeared as a featured tap dancer on The Kiddie Show on the Philadelphia radio station WIP. He was in the US Army during World War II.

In 1947 he became the house drummer at Café Society in New York City, where he played with the leading bebop players of the day, including Tadd Dameron. From 1955 to 1958, Jones toured and recorded with Miles Davis Quintet — a band that became known as "The Quintet" (along with Red Garland on piano, John Coltrane on sax, and Paul Chambers on bass). Davis acknowledged that Jones was his favorite drummer, and stated in his autobiography that he would always listen for Jones in other drummers.

From 1958, Jones worked as a leader, but continued to work as a sideman with other musicians, including Bill Evans and Hank Mobley. Evans, like Davis, also openly stated that Jones was his all-time favorite drummer.

Europe
Between late 1967 and 1972 Jones lived in London and Paris, performing and recording with musicians including Archie Shepp, Mal Waldron and Hank Mobley. For two years (1967–69) Jones taught at a specially organized school in Hampstead, London, but was prevented from otherwise working in the UK by the Musicians' Union. His 1968 album Mo' Joe (also released as Trailways Express) was recorded in London with local musicians (including Peter King, Harold McNair, Chris Pyne, Kenny Wheeler and others).

Later years
Jones toured with Bill Evans in 1976 and 1978, recorded for Galaxy in 1977–79, and worked with Red Garland. From 1981, Jones helped to found the group Dameronia, dedicated to the music of the composer Tadd Dameron, and led it until his death from a heart attack in 1985.

Discography

As leader 
1958:  Blues for Dracula (Riverside, 1958)
1959:  Drums Around the World (Riverside, 1959)
1959:  Showcase (Riverside, 1959)
1960:  Philly Joe's Beat (Atlantic, 1960)
1961:  Together! with Elvin Jones (Atlantic, 1961)
1968:  Trailways Express (Black Lion, 1971) –  also released as Mo Joe and Gone, Gone, Gone
1969:  Philly Joe Jones with the Jef Gilson Ensemble (Disques Vogue, 1969)
1969:  Round Midnight (Lotus Records, 1979)
1969:  Archie Shepp & Philly Joe Jones with Archie Shepp (America, 1969)
1977:  Mean What You Say (Sonet, 1977)
1977:  Philly Mignon (Galaxy, 1978)
1978:  Drum Song (Galaxy, 1985)
1978:  Advance! (Galaxy, 1979)
1981:  Philly Joe Jones Octet, Filet de Sole (Marge, 1992)
1982:  Philly Joe Jones Dameronia, To Tadd with Love (Uptown, 1982)
1983:  Philly Joe Jones Dameronia, Look Stop Listen (Uptown, 1983)

As sideman 
With Chet Baker
 Chet Baker in New York (Riverside, 1959) – recorded in 1958
 Chet Baker Introduces Johnny Pace with Johnny Pace (Riverside, 1959) – recorded in 1958

With Sonny Clark
 Cool Struttin' (Blue Note, 1958)
 Sonny Clark Trio (Blue Note, 1958) – recorded in 1957

With Miles Davis
 The Musings of Miles (Prestige, 1955)
 Miles: The New Miles Davis Quintet (Prestige, 1956)
 Cookin' with the Miles Davis Quintet  (Prestige, 1956)
 Relaxin' with the Miles Davis Quintet (Prestige, 1956)
 Workin' with the Miles Davis Quintet (Prestige, 1956)
 Steamin' with the Miles Davis Quintet (Prestige, 1956)
 'Round About Midnight (Columbia, 1957)
 Porgy and Bess  (Columbia, 1958)
 Milestones  (Columbia, 1958)
 Someday My Prince Will Come (Columbia, 1961)

With Kenny Drew
 Kenny Drew Trio (Riverside, 1956)
 Pal Joey (Riverside, 1958) – recorded in 1957

With Bill Evans
 Everybody Digs Bill Evans (Riverside, 1959) – recorded in 1958
 Interplay (Riverside, 1963) – recorded in 1962
 On Green Dolphin Street (Riverside, 1977) – recorded in 1959
 Quintessence (Fantasy, 1977) – recorded in 1976
 California Here I Come (Verve, 1982) – recorded in 1967

With Art Farmer
 Art Farmer Quintet featuring Gigi Gryce (Prestige, 1955)
 Brass Shout (United Artists, 1959)

With Red Garland
 Red's Good Groove (Jazzland, 1962)
 Keystones! (Xanadu, 1977)
 Crossings (Galaxy, 1978)

With Benny Golson
 The Other Side of Benny Golson (Riverside, 1958)
 Benny Golson and the Philadelphians (United Artists, 1958)

With Dexter Gordon
 Dexter Calling... (Blue Note, 1961)
 Landslide (Blue Note, 1980) – recorded in 1961-62 

With Ernie Henry
 Seven Standards and a Blues (Riverside, 1957)
 Last Chorus (Riverside, 1956–57)

With Elmo Hope
 The Elmo Hope Trio (Blue Note, 1953)
 Here's Hope! (Celebrity, 1961)
 High Hope! (Beacon, 1961)
 Homecoming! (Riverside, 1961)
 Sounds from Rikers Island (Audio Fidelity, 1963)
 The Final Sessions (Evidence, 1996) – recorded in 1966

With Freddie Hubbard
 Goin' Up (Blue Note, 1960)
 Hub Cap (Blue Note, 1961)
 Here to Stay (Blue Note, 1962)

With Bobby Hutcherson
 Four Seasons (Timeless, 1985) – recorded in 1983
 Good Bait (Landmark, 1985) – recorded in 1984

With Duke Jordan
 Duke's Artistry (SteepleChase, 1978)
 The Great Session (SteepleChase, 1981) – recorded in 1978

With Abbey Lincoln
 It's Magic (Riverside, 1958)
 Abbey Is Blue (Riverside, 1959)

With Herbie Mann
Salute to the Flute (Epic, 1957)
Herbie Mann's African Suite (United Artists, 1959)

With Howard McGhee
 The Return of Howard McGhee (Bethlehem, 1956) – recorded in 1955. reissued as That Bop Thing (Bethlehem, 1978).

With Blue Mitchell
 Big 6 (Riverside, 1958)
 Smooth as the Wind (Riverside, 1961) – recorded in 1960-61

With Hank Mobley
 Hank (Blue Note, 1957)
 Workout (Blue Note, 1962) – recorded in 1961
 No Room for Squares (Blue Note, 1964) – recorded in 1963
 Poppin' (Blue Note, 1980) – recorded in 1957
 Another Workout (Blue Note, 1985) – recorded in 1961

With Phineas Newborn Jr.
 Phineas' Rainbow (RCA Victor, 1956)
 A World of Piano! (Contemporary, 1961)

With Sonny Rollins
 Tenor Madness (Riverside, 1956)
 Newk's Time (Blue Note, 1957)

With Archie Shepp
 Blasé (BYG Actuel, 1969)
 Archie Shepp & Philly Joe Jones (America, 1969)

With Clark Terry
 Serenade to a Bus Seat (Riverside, 1957)
 In Orbit (Riverside, 1958)

With others
 Chris Anderson, Inverted Image (Jazzland, 1961)
 Evans Bradshaw, Look Out for Evans Bradshaw! (Riverside, 1958)
 Clifford Brown, Memorial Album (Blue Note, 1953)
 Kenny Burrell, Ellington Is Forever Volume Two (Fantasy, 1975)
 Joe Castro, Mood Jazz (Atlantic, 1957)
 Serge Chaloff, Blue Serge (Capitol, 1956)
 Paul Chambers, Go (Vee-Jay, 1959)
 John Coltrane, Blue Train (Blue Note, 1958)
 Bennie Green, Bennie Green with Art Farmer with Art Farmer (1956)
 Johnny Griffin, Way Out!  (Riverside, 1959)
 Milt Jackson and Wes Montgomery, Bags Meets Wes! (Riverside, 1962)
 Clifford Jordan, The Rotterdam Session (Audio Daddio, 1985)
 Warne Marsh, Warne Marsh (Atlantic, 1958)
 Yoshiaki Miyanoue, Song for Wes (King Records, 1979)
 J. R. Monterose, J. R. Monterose (Blue Note, 1956)
 Art Pepper, Art Pepper Meets the Rhythm Section (Contemporary, 1957)
 Bud Powell, Time Waits (Blue Note, 1958)
 Jimmy Smith, Softly as a Summer Breeze (Blue Note, 1958)
 Sonny Stitt, Sonny Stitt & the Top Brass (Atlantic, 1962)
 The Manhattan Transfer, Vocalese (Atlantic, 1985)
 Ben Webster, Soulmates with Joe Zawinul (Riverside, 1963)
 Jack Wilson, The Two Sides of Jack Wilson (Atlantic, 1964)
 Phil Woods, Pairing Off (Prestige, 1956)

References

External links 
 Philly Joe Jones on Drummerworld.com

1923 births
1985 deaths
African-American drummers
American jazz drummers
Bebop drummers
Hard bop drummers
Post-bop drummers
Miles Davis Quintet members
Musicians from Philadelphia
Riverside Records artists
20th-century American drummers
American male drummers
Jazz musicians from Pennsylvania
American male jazz musicians
Dameronia members
American expatriates in the United Kingdom
American expatriates in France
Black Lion Records artists
Uptown Records (jazz) artists
20th-century American male musicians
Modal jazz drummers